Jørgen Juve (22 November 1906 – 12 April 1983) was a Norwegian football player, jurist, journalist, and non-fiction writer. For most of his career, he played as a striker for Lyn. He also played for a season at FC Basel in Switzerland before retiring and earned a total of 45 caps for the Norway national team. He is the highest-scoring player ever for Norway, with 33 goals in just 45 games. He was captain of the Norway team which won Olympic bronze medals in the 1936 Summer Olympics. He also had a career as a journalist for Dagbladet and Tidens Tegn, and wrote several books.

Personal life
Juve was born in Porsgrunn; the son of tanner Ole Martin Juve and Marie Pøhner. The family name originates from the farm Juve/Djuve in Lårdal, where his grandfather was born. He was the eldest of six children. His two brothers both emigrated to the United States, while his three sisters married and settled in Norway. Among his childhood friends was later composer Klaus Egge. He was married twice, first to Erna Riberg in 1932, and they had two children. One of their grandchildren is folk singer Tone Juve. He was later married to the psychologist Eva Røine, and they had one daughter. He died in Oslo in 1983.

Sports career
Juve started playing football for the Porsgrunn sports club Urædd, only 16 years old. In 1926 he moved to Oslo, where he started playing for the club Lyn. Juve played in the Norwegian Cup final for Lyn in 1928, but the team lost 2–1 against Ørn-Horten. During the season 1930–1931 he played 12 games for FC Basel in which he scored 10 goals.

He made 45 appearances and scored 33 international goals for the Norway national team between 1928 and 1937. His first match for the national team was against Finland in June 1928, and his 45th match was against Denmark in June 1937. Juve scored his first goals for Norway in June 1929, when he scored a hat-trick against Netherlands, and during the next seven matches he scored 16 goals. His 33 goals makes Juve the Norway national team all time top scorer. He only played as a striker in 22 of those games; the rest he alternated between right-back and centre-half.

He was captain of the team that won bronze medals at the 1936 Summer Olympics in Berlin. In the first round of the Olympics, 3 August, the Norwegian team met Turkey, and won the match 4–0. In the second round they met Germany, and won this match 2–0. Both goals were scored by Magnar Isaksen (after 8 and 84 minutes). Among the spectators were Hitler and Goebbels. It was the first and last time Hitler watched a football match. In the semifinal, on 10 August, the Norwegian team lost 1–2 to Italy, after extra time. Finally the team won 3–2 over Poland in the bronze final. In 2006, on the occasion of the 100-year anniversary of Juve's birth Per Ravn Omdal stated that Juve was one of the greatest Norwegian footballers while Sondre Kåfjord, Per Jorsett, Ola Dybwad Olsen and Arne Scheie named Juve as the most important contributor to Norway's only medal in an international football championship for men.

Juve retired from football in 1938, then coached Bodø/Glimt in 1939. He coached Molde FK for a few weeks in 1948.

Writing career
In 1931, Juve obtained a law degree in Basel, and would later work as a journalist and writer. He was sports editor for the newspaper Dagbladet from 1928 to 1934, and for Tidens Tegn from 1934 to 1940. During World War II Juve started the weekly magazine Bragd. In 1941 he moved to Stockholm, where he edited the magazine Norges-Nytt. In 1942 he travelled to London, and later to New York.

He worked as a journalist for Dagbladet from 1945. Among his books are Alt om fotball from 1934, Norsk fotball from 1937, and Øyeblikk from 1978. In Øyeblikk ("Moments") Juve describes memorable moments, such as when Birger Ruud won the men's downhill and Laila Schou Nilsen won the women's downhill at the 1936 Winter Olympics. From the football match against Germany in 1936 he reminisced on how some German players stopped playing and saluted when Hitler appeared. He edited a book on Ole Reistad in 1959. Juve was also a minor ballot candidate for the Liberal Party in the 1949 Norwegian parliamentary election.

Career statistics

Scores and results list Norway's goal tally first, score column indicates score after each Juve goal.

References

External links

1906 births
1983 deaths
Sportspeople from Porsgrunn
Norwegian expatriates in Switzerland
Norwegian footballers
Norway international footballers
Lyn Fotball players
FC Basel players
Footballers at the 1936 Summer Olympics
Olympic footballers of Norway
Olympic medalists in football
Olympic bronze medalists for Norway
1938 FIFA World Cup players
Norwegian football managers
FK Bodø/Glimt managers
Molde FK managers
Norwegian expatriates in Sweden
Norwegian expatriates in the United Kingdom
Norwegian expatriates in the United States
Norwegian sports journalists
Dagbladet people
Norwegian magazine editors
Norwegian non-fiction writers
Norwegian people of World War II
Liberal Party (Norway) politicians
Politicians from Oslo
20th-century Norwegian writers
Medalists at the 1936 Summer Olympics
Association football forwards
20th-century non-fiction writers